Wang Jun (born November 1963) is a Chinese surgeon specializing in thoracic surgery and lung cancer. He is an academician of the Chinese Academy of Engineering who serves as director of Chest Surgery Department of the Peking University People's Hospital. He has been hailed as "The First Thoracoscopic Surgeon in China".

Biography
Wang was born in Huaibin County, Henan, in November 1963. He graduated from Zhengzhou University (1985) and Peking University Health Science Center (1989). In 1995, he won the International Anti-Cancer Alliance (UICC) Graham Fellowship and became a visiting scholar at the University of Washington, University of Chicago, University of Southern California and other famous universities. He joined the Jiusan Society at that same year. In 2000 he was hired as a professor at Peking University. In 2001 he became a member of the All China Youth Federation.

Honours and awards
 2012 State Science and Technology Progress Award (Second Class)  
 November 22, 2019 Member of the Chinese Academy of Engineering (CAE)

References

1963 births
Living people
People from Huaibin County
Chinese surgeons
Chinese oncologists
Zhengzhou University alumni
Peking University alumni
Academic staff of Peking University
Physicians from Henan
20th-century Chinese physicians
21st-century Chinese physicians
Members of the Chinese Academy of Engineering
20th-century surgeons